The Ghost Islands is a radio drama, produced by the ZBS Foundation. It is the eighteenth of the Jack Flanders adventure series and the second of the Fantastic Voyages of Captain Jack Flanders sub-series. It combines elements of old-time radio with psychic phenomena, supernatural beings and energies.

Plot
While relaxing at the Pelican's Pouch in the small Caribbean town of San Miguel, rumors reach Jack and Mojo of the mysterious Ghost Islands which appear and disappear at certain times of the year. Many can see the islands but most just don't. Claudine knows more but is being particularly vague and distant; she does, however, decide that they could use another crew-member and to Jack's chagrin, it's Dominique. Pretty soon, there are 'fuzzy' cocoon shapes moving around, shapes whose home can only be the mysterious Ghost Islands.

Notes and themes
Continues the ecological theme that tourists coming to visit places of beauty or magic, by their very presence, help to destroy such places. Also there are a number of Loa references.

Quotes
Rose: "Sometimes things are as solid as we are willing to allow them to be."
Mojo: "That applies to everything we believe in."
Rose: "Unless you try to sit on it!"

Mojo: "Bunny doesn't look happy."
Jack: "Oh well. You know... teenagers."
Mojo: "Thought they called them 'young adults'?"
Jack: "Yeah. I don't know why."

Credits
 Jack Flanders - Robert Lorick
 Mojo Sam - Dave Adams
 Claudine - Pascale Poirier
 Dominique - Lindsay Ellison
 Rose and Madame Jamal - Laura Roth
 Bunny - Camille Goodhart Hebert
 Una and Fast Freddie - Nebadon Adams
 Joseph - Joseph Gerrick
 Georgette - Linda Malenga
 Producer/Director/Engineer - Tom Lopez
 Writer - Meatball Fulton
 Music - Tim Clark
 Illustration/Graphics - Jaye Oliver

Recorded at Froggy Acres Studios, Fort Miller, NY. Thunderstorm recorded by David Shinn.

The Fantastic Voyages of Captain Jack Flanders
Jack, Mojo and Claudine sail around the Tropics encountering mysterious and other-worldly incidents.
 Orchids and Moonbeams (2005)
 The Ghost Islands (2006)
 Tropical Hot Dog Night (2007)
 The White Castle (2008)

References

External links
 ZBS Foundation
 Whirlitzer of Wisdom fansite

American radio dramas
ZBS Foundation